Kris Richard (born October 28, 1979) is an American football coach and former player who was most recently the defensive backs coach for the New Orleans Saints of the National Football League (NFL). He previously served as an assistant coach for the Dallas Cowboys and Seattle Seahawks.

Playing career

High school
Richard prepped at Serra High School in Gardena, California.

College
Richard attended the University of Southern California, where he played college football as a cornerback under coach Paul Hackett and Pete Carroll from 1998 to 2001.

National Football League

He was drafted by the Seattle Seahawks in the 3rd round (85th overall) in the 2002 NFL Draft. He played for the Seahawks for three seasons. He was traded to the Miami Dolphins for Ronald Flemons in 2005. He was signed by the San Francisco 49ers in 2005 and the Oakland Raiders in 2007.

Coaching career

USC
Richard was hired in 2008 by Carroll as a graduate assistant coach for the USC secondary (defensive backs).

Seattle Seahawks
He followed Carroll to the NFL and joined his former team, the Seahawks, as secondary coach. Richard was instrumental to the formation of the Legion of Boom defensive secondary. He helped coach and develop players such as Richard Sherman, Earl Thomas, Kam Chancellor, Brandon Browner, Byron Maxwell and for his rookie season only, Shaquill Griffin. Bleacher Report described the Legion of Boom's accomplishments as a credit not only to Richard, but to Carroll, who was a safety himself in his playing days and began his coaching career as a secondary coach. He won his first Super Bowl title when the Seahawks defeated the Denver Broncos in Super Bowl XLVIII.

After losing Super Bowl XLIX, the Seahawks promoted Richard to defensive coordinator to replace Dan Quinn, who had left to become the head coach for the Atlanta Falcons.

As the defensive coordinator for the Seahawks, Richard's defense ranked first in points allowed for the 2015 season, third in 2016 and thirteenth in 2017.

Richard was relieved of his defensive coordinator duties following the 2017 season.

Dallas Cowboys
On January 22, 2018, Richard was hired by the Dallas Cowboys as their defensive backs coach. On January 13, 2020, it was reported that Richard would not be retained by Dallas following the removal of head coach Jason Garrett.

New Orleans Saints
On February 2, 2021, Richard was hired by the New Orleans Saints as their defensive backs coach under head coach Sean Payton, replacing Aaron Glenn, who departed to become the defensive coordinator for the Detroit Lions.
On February 1, 2023, Richard parted ways with the Saints.

References

1979 births
Living people
American football cornerbacks
Miami Dolphins players
Oakland Raiders players
People from Carson, California
People from Gardena, California
Players of American football from California
San Francisco 49ers players
Seattle Seahawks coaches
Seattle Seahawks players
Sportspeople from Los Angeles County, California
USC Trojans football coaches
USC Trojans football players
National Football League defensive coordinators
Dallas Cowboys coaches
New Orleans Saints coaches